Nathan Crowley (born 28 February 1966) is an English production designer and a former art director, who is best known for his collaborations with Christopher Nolan. He was nominated six times for an Academy Award for Best Production Design for The Prestige (2006), The Dark Knight (2008), Interstellar (2014), Dunkirk (2017), First Man (2018), and Tenet (2020). 

For The Prestige, he was nominated with set decorator Julie Ochipinti, for The Dark Knight, he was nominated with set decorator Peter Lando, for Interstellar and Dunkirk, he was nominated with set decorator Gary Fettis, and for First Man and Tenet, he was nominated with set decorator Kathy Lucas. Crowley was also nominated five times for the BAFTA Award for Best Production Design for Batman Begins (2005), The Dark Knight (2008), Dunkirk (2017), and First Man (2018).

Filmography
Art director

Dangerous Game (1993)
Monkey Trouble (1994)
Braveheart (1995)
Assassins (1995)
Mission: Impossible 2 (2000)

Production designer

Sweety Barrett (1998)
Falling for a Dancer (1998)
An Everlasting Piece (2000)
Behind Enemy Lines (2001)
Insomnia (2002)
Veronica Guerin (2003)
Batman Begins (2005)
The Lake House (2006)
The Prestige (2006)
The Dark Knight (2008)
Public Enemies (2009)
John Carter (2012)
The Dark Knight Rises (2012)
Interstellar (2014)
Westworld (pilot episode only) (2016)
Dunkirk (2017)
The Greatest Showman (2017)
First Man (2018)
Tenet (2020)
Ron's Gone Wrong (2021)
 Wonka (2023)
Wicked: Part One (2024)
Wicked: Part Two (2025)

Accolades

Academy Awards

Art Directors Guild Awards

British Academy Film Awards

Critics' Choice Movie Awards

Satellite Awards

Saturn Awards

References

External links

British film designers
Living people
1966 births
Film people from London